A number of vessels of the Royal Danish Navy have borne the name Peter Willemoes, after Peter Willemoes.

 , a screw gun boat, in service 1861–1933.

References 

Royal Danish Navy ship names